Yaraymakhi (Dargwa: Яраймахьи) is a rural locality (a selo) in Burgimakmakhinsky Selsoviet, Akushinsky District, Republic of Dagestan, Russia. The population was 149 as of 2010.

Geography 
Yaraymakhi is located 6 km northeast of Akusha (the district's administrative centre) by road. Burgimakmakhi is the nearest rural locality.

References 

Rural localities in Akushinsky District